Bartholomew Ringle (October 16, 1814October 27, 1881) was a German American immigrant, lawyer, and Wisconsin pioneer.  He was instrumental in organizing many of the towns of Marathon County, Wisconsin.  He was the fifth mayor of Wausau, Wisconsin, represented Marathon County for five terms in the Wisconsin State Assembly, and served nearly 18 years as county judge.  His son and grandson also served in the Wisconsin Legislature.

Biography
Ringle was born on October 16, 1814, in the region of Zweibrücken in what is today southwest Germany. At the time of his birth, this was part of the Rhine region which had just been transferred to the dominion of the Kingdom of Bavaria, after having been briefly under the rule of Napoleon's French Empire.  As a resident of Bavaria, he received a common school education and became an attorney.

He emigrated to the United States in 1846, coming directly to the Wisconsin Territory and settling in Germantown, in Washington County.  He lived there for two years before moving to the town of Herman, in Dodge County.  In Herman, Ringle became a prominent member of the community and a member of the Democratic Party of Wisconsin.  He was appointed to serve as postmaster for six years, and was elected justice of the peace, town clerk, and chairman of the town board.

He moved to Wausau, Wisconsin, in Marathon County in 1859.  Wausau was incorporated as a village in 1861; Ringle was elected the 2nd village president in 1862 and was re-elected in 1863.  In 1863, he was also elected to the Wisconsin State Assembly, running on the Democratic Party ticket.  He represented all of Marathon and Wood counties.  In the 1863 election, he was also elected county judge, and would continue to hold that office until his death.  In 1864, he was also elected to serve as county clerk—that office he held for three two-year terms.

He did not run for re-election to the Assembly in 1864, but returned to the Assembly with the election of 1871, and then served three more terms in 1875, 1876, and 1877.  While serving in the Assembly, he was instrumental in the act to incorporate Wausau as a city.  He was elected the fifth mayor of Wausau in 1876.

Ringle continued to work as an attorney and county judge until his death.  He died of heart disease while working at his desk in Wausau, on October 27, 1881.  He was buried at Wausau's Pine Grove Cemetery.  Reports stated that Wausau "never saw a larger funeral."

Personal life and family
Bartholomew Ringle married Magdalena Amalia Pick in June 1834, while they were both living in the Kingdom of Bavaria.  They had twelve children together, though two died in infancy, and two others died in childhood.  Several of their children grew to prominence in Wisconsin.

Charles (Carl) Ringle was a successful merchant in Herman, Dodge County, Wisconsin, and served as town chairman, town treasurer, town clerk, postmaster, and justice of the peace.

Valentine Ringle served as a member of the city council in Wausau and city treasurer and postmaster.  He was also a publisher of two newspapers, the English-language Wisconsin River Pilot and the German-language Wausau Wochenblatt.

John Ringle was a successful merchant in Wausau and also served as postmaster there.  He served three terms as county clerk, three terms as a member of the State Assembly, and two years in the State Senate.  His son, Oscar Ringle, also served in the State Assembly.

Electoral history

Wisconsin Assembly (1871)

| colspan="6" style="text-align:center;background-color: #e9e9e9;"| General Election, November 7, 1871

Wisconsin Assembly (1874, 1875, 1876)

| colspan="6" style="text-align:center;background-color: #e9e9e9;"| General Election, November 3, 1874

| colspan="6" style="text-align:center;background-color: #e9e9e9;"| General Election, November 2, 1875

| colspan="6" style="text-align:center;background-color: #e9e9e9;"| General Election, November 7, 1876

Notes

References

1814 births
1881 deaths
Wisconsin postmasters
German emigrants to the United States
American justices of the peace
People from Germantown, Wisconsin
People from Herman, Dodge County, Wisconsin
Politicians from Wausau, Wisconsin
Wisconsin state court judges
County supervisors in Wisconsin
Members of the Wisconsin State Assembly
Mayors of places in Wisconsin
19th-century American politicians
19th-century American judges